The 2017–18 Dijon FCO season was the 19th professional season of the club since its creation in 1998.

Players

Out on loan

Competitions

Ligue 1

League table

Results summary

Results by round

References

Dijon FCO seasons
Dijon